Miss Earth 2013, the 13th edition of the Miss Earth pageant, was held on December 7, 2013 at the Versailles Palace in Las Piñas, Metro Manila, Philippines. Tereza Fajksová of the Czech Republic crowned her successor Alyz Henrich of Venezuela at the end of the event.

The pageant was broadcast live internationally on Star World last 7 December 2013, 10:00 a.m. on ABS-CBN, or coverage on Studio 23, TFC-The Filipino Channel, and also on channels of participating counties worldwide. Miss Earth 2008, Karla Henry, was present in the pageant to express the gratitude that the different countries had done to help the Philippines after the devastation that Typhoon Haiyan had caused.

This edition of Miss Earth made some historical feat: When Alyz Henrich won, Alyz made history as she put Venezuela in the map of pageantry as the only country to win all the Big Four international beauty pageants at least twice; Katia Wagner, who was declared as Miss Earth-Air, is the highest Austrian beauty queen to achieve such feat in the Miss Earth pageant to date. Miss Thailand's Punika Kulsoontornrut won the title as Miss Earth-Water 2013, the highest title a Thai beauty queen achieved in the said beauty pageant. She shares that distinction with Watsaporn Wattanakoon, the Miss Earth-Water 2010. While the representative from Korea, Catharina Choi, achieved the same feat as Katia Wagner, but also the first Asian to snatch the Miss Earth-Fire title.

The theme of this year's Miss Earth edition was "International Year of Water Cooperation".

Results

 Miss Earth
 Miss Earth – Air
 Miss Earth – Water
 Miss Earth – Fire
 Top 8
 Top 20

Placements

Special awards

Major awards

Sponsor/Minor awards

Order of announcements

Top 16

Top 8
 
 
 
 
 
 
 
 

Note: The Carousel Productions has confirmed that Punika Kulsoontornrut, Miss Earth Water 2013 was dethroned due to joining Miss International 2014 thus violating her contract as a titleholder.

Medal table

Challenge Events

Evening Gown Final Competition
The event was held at the Grand Ballroom of Crimson Hotel Filinvest City.

Swimsuit Preliminary Competition
The event was held at F1 Hotel and Hannah Beach Resort and Convention Center.

Talent Preliminary Competition
The event was held at Skye W High Street, A-Venue Mall and New World Hotel.

Resorts Wear Preliminary Competition

Miss Friendship
Each group of the Miss Earth 2013 took a bit of time off from their rigid (but fun) rehearsals at the Versailles Palace in Alabang to cast their votes for the special title of Miss Friendship.

Miss Photogenic
The event was conducted through online fan voting system.

Miss Eco Beauty
The event was conducted through online fan voting system.

M.E National Costume Competition
The event was held on 25 November 2012 at the F1 Hotel in Taguig.

I Love My Planet Schools Campaign
The event was held on 18 November 2013. The following candidates were chosen as the Best School Tour Teachers:

Most Child Friendly
In the same event, the following candidates were chosen as the Most Child Friendly:

Judges

Background music
 Opening: "Feel This Moment" by Christina Aguilera
 Swimsuit competition:
 Evening gown competition: "Wrecking Ball by Miley Cyrus

Contestants
88 delegates have been selected to compete:

Notes

Debuts

Returns

Last competed in 2006:
 
Last competed in 2007:
 
 
 
Last competed in 2008:
 
Last competed in 2009:
 
 
Last competed in 2010:
 
 
 
Last competed in 2011:

Designations
  – Kristina de Munter was appointed to represent Belgium, she was previously Miss International Belgium 2011.
  – Diana Ortegon was appointed as "Miss Tierra Colombia 2013" after a casting call took place.
  – Ioana Mihalache was appointed to represent Romania, she was previously Miss Universe Romania 2012 1st runner-up.
  – Vanessa Donastorg was appointed to represent US Virgin Islands.

Replacements
  – Natalia Stamuli is replaced by Afroviti Goge because Stamuli did not reach the minimum age requirement.
  – Silvienne Winklaar, who was elected Miss Earth Curaçao 2013 is replaced by Archangela Garcia who was previously Miss Curaçao 2013 contestant.
  – Cristina Girón is replaced by Jimena Mansilla Wever.
  – Hyo-hee Kim is replaced by Catharina Choi who was previously one of the 2nd runner-up of Miss Korea 2013.
  – Karen Duarte is replaced by Leticia Caceres.
  – Elina Kireeva is replaced by Olesya Boslovyak.
  – Natalia Varchenko is replaced by Anastasia Sukh.

Withdrawals
During the contest
  – Nela Zisser was able to participate during the preliminary activities in Manila but she decided to withdraw before the coronation night due to food poisoning.

Before the contest
  – Rym Amari withdrew for undisclosed reasons.
  – Francis Massiel Sousa withdrew for undisclosed reasons.
  – Restituta Mifumu Nguema withdrew for undisclosed reasons.
  – Ieva Lase withdrew for undisclosed reasons.
  – Shanzay Hayat withdrew due to lack of sponsorship for the pageant. She competed the following year.
  – Brunella Fossa withdrew due to financial issues.
  – Velmary Paola Cabassa Vélez did not compete.
  – Diamond Langi withdrew after she was Crowned Miss Face of Beauty International 2013.
  – Maha Sayi withdrew for undisclosed reasons.

Give up

International broadcasters

1Delayed Telecast on 8 December 2013 (10:00 AM Philippine Standard Time)

References

External links
 

2013
2013 beauty pageants
Beauty pageants in the Philippines
2013 in the Philippines